Monesiglio is a comune (municipality) in the Province of Cuneo in the Italian region Piedmont, located about  southeast of Turin and about  east of Cuneo.

Monesiglio borders the following municipalities: Camerana, Gottasecca, Mombarcaro, and Prunetto. It is home to a castle, built in the 13th century, later (17th century) rebuilt into a  late-Gothic palace. It houses several 16th-century frescoes.

References 

Cities and towns in Piedmont